Climate theory may refer to :

Any theory in Climatology (Climate Science)
The climate theory of Montesquieu
Global warming conspiracy theory, theory that global warming science is being falsified